Procambarus gibbus, the Muckalee Crayfish, is a species of crayfish in the family Cambaridae. It is endemic to the Flint River drainage in the U.S. state of Georgia. The common name refers to the Muckalee Creek in Sumter County, Georgia, from where the first specimens were collected.

It is listed as Data Deficient on the IUCN Red List.

References

Cambaridae
Endemic fauna of Georgia (U.S. state)
Freshwater crustaceans of North America
Crustaceans described in 1969
Taxa named by Horton H. Hobbs Jr.
Taxonomy articles created by Polbot